Innuit Mountain is a mountain located  northwest of Mount Caubvick in the Torngat Mountains of northern Labrador, Canada.

Situation

Innuit Mountain lies at the head of Nachvak Fiord and has a twin summit called Packard Mountain.

References

Labrador
One-thousanders of Newfoundland and Labrador